Debendra Green Grove English High School, abbreviated as DGGEHS, is a private co-educational high school in Monojuli, a village near to the town of Dhekiajuli in Sonitpur district, Assam, India. It is also known as Debendra Chandra Dey Memorial English School in memory of Debendra Chandra Dey, the father of the Principal.

History 
The school was established in 1981 by Biplab Dey and its establishment is celebrated annually on 4 and 5 February. Sports day is celebrated 2–3 days before the Foundation Day.

The school was registered with the Board of Secondary Education, Assam, and sent its first batch of students for the High School Leaving Certificate (HSLC) examination in 1991. The HSLC examination centre has since been at Netaji Bidya Mandir in Dhekiajuli, which also caters for some other schools in its vicinity.

Education System 
The medium of instruction is English. Regional subjects such as Assamese, Hindi and Bengali are also taught up to secondary level and thereafter students have to choose between Assamese and Hindi. The school strictly follows the ideals and rules of SEBA. Extra-curricular activities are optionally taught. The school takes part in various cultural festivals and events.

Achievements 
One of its students, Anushree Kapila, attained a state rank in the HSLC Examination of 2009 in Assam. Another student, Abhik Sarkar attained third rank in Ajmal Talent Search Examination, 2013.

Building and other facilities 
The school compound is fairly large and houses a hostel, a park and parking spots for vehicles and bicycles of students. There are separate kindergarten classrooms with ACs and other facilities. There is a school bus, a van and a tourister for transportation of students. The playground is large and surrounded by trees and shrubs. A library, a science lab and a computer lab are present with dedicated space. An auditorium and additional rooms are in progress. The location around the school is peaceful and quiet being away from the main town.

References 

High schools and secondary schools in Assam
1987 establishments in Assam
Educational institutions established in 1987
Co-educational schools in India